Saint Demetrius the Neomartyr is an Orthodox Christian saint, commemorated on 14 April in the Church of Greece.

Demetrius was a Greek Orthodox Christian boy born in Floka and raised in Ligouditsa, both in the region of Arcadia, near the regional capital of Tripoli. As with most of Greece at the time, the region was ruled by the Ottoman Empire. His mother died when he was very young, and his father, Elias, remarried. Due to ill-treatment by his stepmother, Demetrius left home and went to seek work in Tripoli, where he was apprenticed to a barber. He converted to Islam and took the name Mehmet, but later repented and became an Orthodox monk on the island of Chios.

Demetrius fell into a deep depression when the weight of his sin fully weighed in and decided that to expiate his mistake, he must perform a great penance: returning to Tripoli to confess publicly that he was recanting his conversion to Islam. His abbot tried to dissuade him, to no avail, and Demetrius returned to Tripoli and publicly confessed his re-conversion to Christianity several times. This included him going to his former barber boss and asking him to slit his throat right there, which neither the boss nor the other barbers did. When this didn't work, he went up to the guards of a nearby leader and told them he had apostatized, which got him detained.

Demetrius was taken to the presence of a Turkish judge, judged for apostasy from Islam, convicted and sentenced to die in 1803, despite the attempted intercession of a Turkish friend, who tried to cover up for him by altering the records of Demetrius' confession; Demetrius noticed this and demanded to be executed anyway, also ignoring the judge's own desire to let him go. Finally, Demetrius was taken to the local market (reportedly, he cheerfully sang Christian hymns in his way), and publicly executed by beheading; it took three strokes, and his severed head and body, though ordered to be burned, were hidden and preserved by local Christians as relics.

References

18th-century births
1803 deaths
Year of birth unknown
Saints of Ottoman Greece

People from Arcadia, Peloponnese
Converts to Eastern Orthodoxy from Islam
People executed by the Ottoman Empire by decapitation
Executed Greek people
Greeks from the Ottoman Empire
Greek saints of the Eastern Orthodox Church